Sumbawanga Rural District is one of three districts of the Rukwa Region of Tanzania. It is bordered to the northeast by the Sumbawanga Urban District, to the south by Zambia and to the northwest by the Nkasi District.

According to the 2002 Tanzania National Census, the population of the Sumbawanga Rural District was 373,080.

Wards

The Sumbawanga Rural District is administratively divided into twenty-three wards:

 Kaengesa
 Kalambazite
 Kaoze
 Kasanga
 Katazi
 Kipeta
 Laela
 Legezamwendo
 Lusaka
 Mambwekenya
 Mambwenkoswe
 Matai
 Miangalua
 Milepa
 Mkowe
 Mpui
 Msanzi
 Mtowisa
 Muze
 Mwazye
 Mwimbi
 Sandalula
 Sopa

Districts of Rukwa Region